Oksino is a village in Zapolyarny District, Nenets Autonomous Okrug, Russia. It had a population of 339 as of 2010, a decrease from its population of 429 in 2002.

Climate

Oksino has a subarctic climate (Dfc).

References

Rural localities in Nenets Autonomous Okrug